KBYU-FM (89.1 MHz) is a classical music radio station run by Brigham Young University in Provo, Utah.  It is known on-air as Classical 89.  It is a production of BYU Radio.  It transmits at an effective radiated power of 32 kW. Its transmitting tower is located on a peak of the Oquirrh Mountains northwest of the university campus, and southwest of Salt Lake City.

The station previously broadcast at a frequency of 88.9 MHz (during which time its nickname was Classical 88).  The frequency was shifted in 1988 by directive of the FCC, to alleviate interference for nearby frequencies used for aerial navigation, and to allow for a new full-power station to be built on 99.5 in the Salt Lake market.  Classical 89 also has the following translators:  89.5 FM K208BZ Spanish Fork, 106.9 FM K295BW Nephi, 96.1 FM K241BV Milford, 100.3 FM K262BM Cedar City, 100.7 FM K264BM Ivins.

History 
KBYU began as a student-run carrier current station at 660 AM in 1946.  T. Earl Pardoe, a professor at Brigham Young University, suggested to student Owen S. Rich that the university should have its own radio station. Using his experience as a radio and radar technical during World War II, it became available across Provo and the surrounding area in 1948 by using the city's power lines as an antenna.  The radio programming included talent shows, live dramas, club features, and popular music. In 1960, BYU was granted a commercial FM license.

After the FM license was granted, the programming shifted to classical music. Students requested the programming be switched to Broadway show tunes, jazz, rock, and student talk shows. After expanding the programming, listeners off-campus did not believe the programming held to standards of the Church of Jesus Christ of Latter-day Saints (LDS Church). For example, after a series on political revolutionaries in 1971, people complained that the programming was sympathetic to the achievements of Ho Chi Minh and Malcolm X. BYU responded that they would not broadcast anything that did not follow LDS Church standards and they the university had sufficient budget to edit material that did not follow LDS Church standards. In 1981, a series on homosexuality was canceled by the station manager.

The new station signed on for the first time on May 9, 1960, under the temporary calls KBRG.  After negotiations to get the KBYU calls from a liberty ship, the call letters changed to KBYU on November 9, 1960. The station presently broadcasts around the clock, having gone to that schedule in the mid-1980s.  Most of its on-air staff consists of professionals, although students do cover some weeknight and weekend on-air shifts.  Students also play a key role in behind-the-scenes functions.

The station is operated as a non-profit corporation, and solicits donations from the public to raise a portion of its operating revenue. Other funding sources include Brigham Young University and local underwriting by businesses and arts organizations.

In 2006, KBYU-FM began broadcasting an HD Radio signal along with its main signal, and subsequently began carrying sports and talk programming from sister station BYU Radio on its HD2 signal.

On October 23, 2017, Brigham Young University announced that KBYU-FM and KBYU-TV would drop their existing programming and become full-time outlets for BYU Radio and BYUtv respectively. The planned flip of KBYU-FM was met with criticism from listeners, as it was the only terrestrial radio station in the market devoted to classical music. On April 26, 2018, the university announced that it would instead purchase 107.9 KUMT to use as a full-time outlet for BYU Radio, allowing it to maintain KBYU-FM's classical format.

Programming
KBYU-FM carries a classical music format, as well as BYU devotionals and forums. In addition to carriage on FM radio, the station is also available online.

Translators

References

External links

BYURadio site (station heard on KBYU-FM HD2)
KBYU-FM records, Vault MSS 7932, L. Tom Perry Special Collections, Harold B. Lee Library, Brigham Young University

Mass media in Salt Lake City
Brigham Young University
Classical music radio stations in the United States
BYU
BYU-FM
Radio stations established in 1946
1946 establishments in Utah
Harold B. Lee Library-related University Archives articles